Cape Town High School is a public English medium co-educational high school in the inner city of Cape Town in Cape Town in the Western Cape province of South Africa 
It is located in the inner city and it is open for both girls and boys.
It is an English medium school and specifically a science school

External links
 

Schools in Cape Town
1860 establishments in the Cape Colony
Educational institutions established in 1860